Analytic Theology (AT) refers to a growing body of primarily Christian theological literature resulting from the application of the methods and concepts of late-twentieth-century analytic philosophy. In the last decade, various lectures, study centers, conference sections, academic journals, and at least one monographic series have appeared with "Analytic Theology" in their title or description. The movement counts both philosophers and theologians in its ranks, but a growing number of theologians with philosophy training produce AT literature. Analytic theology is strongly related to the philosophy of religion, but it is wider in scope due to its willingness to engage topics not normally addressed in the philosophy of religion (such as the Eucharist, sin, salvation, and eschatology). Given the types of historical philosophy that have funded the analytic philosophy of religion, theologians are frequently involved in retrieval theology as they revisit, re-appropriate, and modify older Christian solutions to theological questions. Analytic theology has strong roots in the Anglo-American analytic philosophy of religion in the last quarter of the twentieth century, as well as similarities at times to scholastic approaches to theology. However, the term analytic theology primarily refers to a resurgence of philosophical-theological work during the last 15 years by a community of scholars spreading outward from centers in the UK and the US.

Defining analytic theology
Historically and methodologically, AT is both a way of approaching theological works as well as a sociological or historical shift in academic theology.

Analytic theology defined as a theological method
Due to its similarities to philosophical theology and philosophy of religion, defining analytic theology remains a challenge. Systematic theologian, William J. Abraham, defined analytic theology as “systematic theology attuned to the deployment of the skills, resources, and virtues of analytic philosophy. It is the articulation of the central themes of Christian teaching illuminated by the best insights of analytic philosophy.”

Philosopher, Michael Rea, defines analytic theology as “the activity of approaching theological topics with the ambitions of an analytic philosopher and in a style that conforms to the prescriptions that are distinctive of analytic philosophical discourse. It will also involve, more or less, pursuing those topics in a way that engages the literature that is constitutive of the analytic, employing some of the technical jargon from that tradition, and so on. But, in the end, it is the style and the ambitions that are most central.”

Cambridge theologian Sarah Coakley, by contrast, warns that attempts to set down an essentialist definition for analytic theology (i.e. a category that some are in and some are not in) will distract from the productive work resulting from the recent flourishing of AT.
       
More specifically, analytic theology can be understood in a narrow and wide sense. When understood more widely, analytic theology is a method to be applied in theological works. Like other methodological approaches to theology (e.g. historical theology, retrieval theology, post-liberal theology), analytic theology, in this view, is a way of doing theological work that is independent of one's theological commitments. In this wider sense, Muslims, Jews, and Christians could all apply the same analytic methods to their theological work. William Wood has called this the “formal model” of analytic theology.
      
By contrast, some are concerned that those participating in the analytic theology movement are doing more than just applying a particular method to their work. Given that most of its practitioners are Christians, some wonder if analytic theology is also a theological program (i.e. it is committed to forwarding a certain body of theological beliefs). These concerns characterize the narrow sense of AT. In contrast to the formal method, Wood calls this narrow sense the “substantive model” of analytic theology. Wood believes that the substantive model of AT is “theology that draws on the tools and methods of analytic philosophy to advance a specific theological agenda, one that is, broadly speaking, associated with traditional Christian orthodoxy. On this conception, the central task of analytic theology would be to develop philosophically well-grounded accounts of traditional Christian doctrines like the Trinity, Christology, and the atonement.” 

Oliver Crisp, one of the founders of the contemporary AT movement, comments that AT is more than just a theological style of writing. It also involves work by theologians who hold that “there is some theological truth of the matter and that this truth of the matter can be ascertained and understood by human beings.”

Characteristics of analytic theology
Analytic theology can be identified by at least two but usually three features. First is the analytic method itself.

Second is the focus on theological topics, such as incarnation or resurrection. There is not a hard boundary between AT and analytic philosophy of religion. However, analytic theology tends to treat a wider range of theological topics than the philosophy of religion, whereas the latter might limit its focus to the existence of God, the problem of evil, and a very minimal concept of God (i.e. omniscience, omnipotence, omnibenevolence). Analytic theologians assume the existence of God and analyze theological topics not often addressed by the philosophy of religion.

Third is an engagement with the wider analytic philosophical or theological literature for concepts that can help answer theological questions. Very often these concepts are deployed in the process of solving questions or conceptual “problems” that accompany certain theological beliefs (e.g. the natures of Christ, or the question of free will in Heaven). This literary aspect may be as essential as the other two. For example, ideas such as speech-act theory or possible worlds semantics have been applied to theological questions involving divine revelation or foreknowledge. In other words, analytic theology not only involves theology that was written about with a certain analytic style but an application of ideas found in the analytic philosophical literature.

The analytic method 
The most frequently mentioned characteristic of analytic theology is its broad methodological and thematic overlap with analytic philosophy. An effort to tentatively illustrate some rhetorical features that characterized analytic philosophy was first made by philosopher Michael Rea in the introduction to Analytic Theology. The idea was that some of these ways of pursuing an analysis of topics are found to characterize analytic theology. Rae's five characteristics are:

P1. Write as if philosophical positions and conclusions can be adequately formulated in sentences that can be formalized and logically manipulated. 
P2. Prioritize precision, clarity, and logical coherence. 
P3 Avoid substantive (non-decorative) use of metaphor and other tropes whose semantic content outstrips their propositional content. 
P4 Work as much as possible with well-understood primitive concepts, and concepts that can be analyzed in terms of those. 
P5 Treat conceptual analysis (insofar as it is possible) as a source of evidence.

Imagine, for example, that a theologian writes that Jesus's cry of dereliction from the cross indicates that the Trinity was broken or ruptured mysteriously during Jesus's crucifixion. First, in terms of differentiating AT from the philosophy of religion, this is not something likely to be addressed in the philosophy of religion. An analytic theologian might ask for what “broken” denotes given its connotations when used about the God of Christianity. Is the original writer merely using rhetorical flair or are they trying to imply an actual ontological change in God? The analytic theologian, given her penchant for theory building, might list out the implications for other Christian doctrines depending on what meaning is intended by the word “broken.” The analytic theologian might turn to the history of theology, philosophically careful theologians, in search of concepts that help her speak about Christ being “forsaken” by God without doing so in a way that unnecessarily risks contradicting an orthodox understanding of the Trinity.
	
Analytic writers are willing to agree with others that many things about God easily outstrip our conceptual abilities. Mystery or apophatic theology is not incompatible with AT. However the latter is more likely than others to press back when such concepts are used in a way that seems unnecessarily incoherent or risks contradicting other doctrines.

Analytic theology defined sociologically and historically
Andrew Chignell has offered a different definition of analytic theology: “analytic theology is a new, concerted, and well-funded effort on the part of philosophers of religion, theologians, and religion scholars to re-engage and learn from one another, instead of allowing historical, institutional, and stylistic barriers to keep them apart.” This definition is seen as significant because in some senses analytic theology is not substantially different methodologically than some philosophical theology work done in the 1980s and 1990s. For example, Thomas V. Morris's books The Logic of God Incarnate (1986) and Our Idea of God (1991) exemplify the method and style of those working in analytic theology but predates the current trend by twenty years. 

From this perspective, what characterizes analytic theology is sociological as much as methodological. In addition to its stylistic features, analytic theology is a reconciliation between philosophers, theologians, and biblical studies scholars that were less present before the mid-2000s. Chignell mentions at least two edited volumes that attempted to bring together philosophers, theologians and scholars of religion to work on questions they had in common. It is difficult to say why the analytic theology movement did not gain momentum prior to Crisp and Rea's efforts between 2004 and the 2009 publication of Analytic Theology. In their respective fields, Crisp and Rea both witnessed a lack of eagerness for interdisciplinary interaction between philosophy and theology. One possibility for the delay is that more time was needed (in the mid-1990s) before works by Richard Swinburne, Thomas Flint, Nicholas Wolterstorff, Eleonore Stump, Alvin Plantinga, and others made room in the theological academy for a movement like analytic theology. 

An alternative and significant factor is the role the John Templeton Foundation played in funding projects connected with analytic theology. It is not inconsequential that the John Templeton Foundation has helped to fund analytic theology-type projects on three continents, including North America, at the University of Notre Dame's Center for Philosophy of Religion; in Europe, at the Munich School of Philosophy and University of Innsbruck; and, in the Middle East, at the Shalem Center and then later the Herzl Institute in Jerusalem. More recent Templeton-funded initiatives include a three-year project at Fuller Theological Seminary in California and the establishment of Logos Institute for Analytic and Exegetical Theology at the University of St. Andrews, Scotland.

The history of analytic theology

Contemporary analytic theology, represented by scholars like Oliver Crisp and Michael Rea, has its roots in three periods of Western philosophical history. These periods include: (a) historical scholastic philosophical theology, (b) mid-twentieth-century responses by Christian philosophers to challenges of religious epistemology and religious language about God, (c) a turn by Christian philosophers to work on more traditionally theological topics in the 1980s. 
 
Analytic theology is a contemporary movement. It is a resurgence in philosophical theology that began in the United Kingdom and United States. However, it has always had a strong retrieval element to it. Retrieval theology refers to thinkers revisiting and reappropriating certain ideas from historical theology or philosophy. In analytic theology, this retrieval often includes a revisitation to the works of theologian-philosophers like Augustine, Duns Scotus, Anselm, Thomas Aquinas, and Jonathan Edwards. 
	
In Medieval Europe, a rich tradition of philosophical thought about theological topics flourished for over a thousand years. This tradition of philosophical theology was brought into steep decline by the philosophy of Immanuel Kant and the theology of Friedrich Schleiermacher. In the twentieth century, logical positivism stood as the low water-mark of philosophical theology with its denial of the very possibility to talk meaningfully about God at all. As a result, a very robust dividing wall separated philosophy and theology by the mid-twentieth century. 
       
In August 1929, a group of philosophers in Vienna referred to as the Vienna Circle, published a manifesto containing a verificationist criterion to be used as a criterion by which statements could be analyzed in terms of meaning. Any statements that could not be broken down into empirically verifiable concepts were held to be meaningless, preventing any metaphysical (or theological) dialogue from being meaningful. 
       
This verification principle began to crumble under the weight of its strictness on at least four counts: (a) no satisfactory concept of empirical verifiability could be agreed upon, (b) supporters of logical positivism like Carl Hempel argued that it seemed to invalidate less strictly worded universal generalizations of science, (c) ordinary language philosophers argued that it rendered meaningless imperatives, interrogatives, and other performative utterances, (d) the verification principle itself was not empirically verifiable by its own standards. 
       
By the 1950s, logical positivism was in decline and with it the stance that metaphysical claims were meaningless. The conversation shifted to require speakers to show why theological or philosophical claims were true or false. This had a liberating effect on analytic philosophy. According to Nicholas Wolterstorff, the demise of logical positivism also had the effect of casting doubt over other attempts, such as those of Kant or the logical positivists, to point out a deep epistemological boundary between the knowable and unknowable. Through this, Wolterstorff challenged the divide between philosophy and theology for decades. Wolterstorff states that one result of the demise of logical positivismhas proved to be that the theme of limits on the thinkable and the assertible has lost virtually all interest for philosophers in the analytic tradition. Of course, analytic philosophers do still on occasion charge people with failing to think a genuine thought or make a genuine judgment. But the tacit assumption has come to be that such claims will always have to be defended on an individual, ad hoc, basis; deep skepticism reigns among analytic philosophers concerning all grand proposals for demarcating the thinkable from the unthinkable, the assertible from the non-assertible. Wolterstorff also suggests that classical foundationalism collapsed as the theory of epistemology in philosophy, but it was not replaced by an alternative theory. What has resulted was an environment of dialogical pluralism where no major epistemological framework is widely held.
       
In this context of dialogical pluralism, the state of play returned to one in which metaphysical or theistic belief could be taken as rational provided one could give justification for those beliefs. Two mechanisms for doing this became popular: Reformed Epistemology and evidentialist approaches that made use of Bayesian probability. Either way, logical argumentation and rational coherence remained important for such beliefs. In addition to arguments for rational belief in God, Christian philosophers also began to give arguments for the rationality of various aspects of belief within a theistic worldview. 
       
In 1978 the Society of Christian Philosophers was formed. Six years later Alvin Plantinga delivered his famous presidential addresses, "Advice to Christian Philosophers," in which he signaled the need for Christians philosophers to do more than follow the assumptions and approaches to philosophy accepted in the wider field, given that many of those assumptions were antithetical to Christianity. He goes on to write that
       

      
In the 1980s and 1990s Christian philosophers began to turn much of their efforts to explicating questions unique to Christian theology, thereby setting the precedent for the type of work done in analytic theology. The decades saw the production of more literature by Christian philosophers treating theological topics such as the attributes of God and atonement by scholars like Richard Swinburne and his fellow Orielense David Brown, and, in fact, it was, according to Swinburne, Brown whose "book, The Divine Trinity, was the first book in the 'analytic' philosophy of religion tradition to analyse a central Christian doctrine". However, much of that work remained largely appreciated by Christian philosophers and less so by Christian theologians. As noted above, both Oliver Crisp and Michael Rea found that philosophers and theologians were not interacting and sharing resources as late as the mid-2000s. It was in the mid-2000s at the University of Notre Dame, they floated the idea of an edited volume aimed at bringing philosophers and theologians together to work on theological questions with a methodology tuned to the style and resources of analytic philosophy.

It was with the publication of Analytic Theology that AT began to garner attention, both positive and negative, in philosophical and theological circles. In 2012, a session at the American Academy of Religion (AAR) was dedicated to discussing the volume, followed by several articles in volume 81 of the Journal of the American Academy of Religion. In 2013, the Journal of Analytic Theology was first published. In 2015, Thomas McCall, professor of theology at Trinity Evangelical Divinity School, published An Invitation to Analytic Christian Theology with InterVarsity Press. At the 2016 Evangelical Theological Society (ETS) annual conference a series of papers were given reviewing and analyzing McCall's book to a packed room. By 2020, several multiple-year projects have been funded at graduate-level institutions that focus on AT. Edited volumes, such as those in the Oxford Studies in Analytic Theology series, continue to be released. Several dissertations have now been published as monographs that treat theological topics in an analytic style, and both the AAR and ETS continue to have regular sections devoted to papers on AT.

Analytic theology compared to other disciplines
In a 2013 article of the Journal of the American Academy of Religion, Andrew Chignell notes that some of the reviewers and writers in the 2009 Analytic Theology edited volume wondered what the difference, if any, was between analytic theology and philosophical theology. Similarly, Max Baker-Hytch, a philosopher of religion, asked what the difference between analytic theology and the analytic philosophy of religion was in an article in the Journal of Analytic Theology. Demarcating boundaries between disciplines is difficult. However, here are a few distinctions: 
       
 Analytic theology versus philosophical theology. The difference between AT and philosophical theology is largely sociological or historical. Analytic theology just is philosophical theology applied by theologians with philosophical methods and sensitivities. In time, as analytic theologians listen to the calls by biblical theologians to be more sensitive to exegetical issues, there might develop a slight difference between even philosophical theology and analytic theology.
 Analytic theology versus the philosophy of religion. The difference between AT and the philosophy of religion is a difference in scope. Given that AT grew out of Anglo-American philosophy of religion, they share much of the same history up until the 1990s. However, AT is willing to treat topics of Christian theology that one will not see addressed in the philosophy of religion. Furthermore, analytic theologians are not focused on proving the existence of God. Instead, they begin with assuming God's existence and the deliverances of their particular Christian tradition, and they work on theological questions with the tools of analytic philosophy.
 Analytic theology versus systematic theology. The difference between AT and systematic theology is currently under debate. Michael Rea's introduction in Analytic Theology has not been received well by some theologians. Analytic Theology has thus been challenged as legitimately theology. Some suspect it is no more than philosophy in theological costume. William Abraham argues that analytic theology is systematic theology and that it was only a matter of time before something like analytic theology took root in the theological world. Oliver Crisp has published an article demonstrating how analytic theology could qualify itself as systematic theology. Crisp cites leading theologians to demonstrate that there is no agreed upon definition for systematic theology. He shows how analytic theology shares a common task and goals with systematic theology and rises above a conceptual threshold established by the way various theologians view systematic theology. In a 2017 interview, Oliver Crisp suggests that AT is not attempting to take over the work of theology but instead is suggesting an additional set of resources that theologians could turn to find help in their theological projects.
       
Analytic theology thus sits at the boundaries between several disciplines.

Practitioners and publications of analytic theology
As noted above, before the mid-2000s most of the scholars doing something like analytic theology were Christian philosophers working on their own projects that were not explicitly part of an AT "movement."

Practitioners
Given the duality in theology and philosophy, nothing prevents philosophers with theological skills or theologians with philosophical training from doing analytic theology. Some of the best work resourced by analytic theologians come from philosophers, including nearly all of the past presidents of the Society of Christian Philosophers. AT scholars can be categorized by which artificial "generation" in which they published their work, which is primarily demarcated by decade:

 First generation (1960s and 1970s): Basil Mitchell, Nicholas Wolterstorff, George Mavrodes, Alvin Plantinga, William Alston, Richard Swinburne, and David Brown
 Second generation (1980s): Plantinga, Wolterstorff, Swinburne, William Hasker, Thomas Flint, Linda Zagzebski, Eleonore Stump, Thomas Morris, James P. Moreland, William Lane Craig, and William J. Abraham
 Third generation (1990s and 2000s): Oliver Crisp, Michael Rea, Thomas McCall, Trent Doughtery, Brian Leftow, Sarah Coakley, etc.
 Fourth generation (2010–): Tim Pawl, Jonathan C. Rutledge, Joshua Cockayne, J. T. Turner, James Arcadi, Jordan Wessling, Aku Visala, R. T. Mullins, Kevin Hector, R. C. Kunst, etc.

Examples of publications
The literature representative of analytic theology is growing rapidly. A few examples include: Analytic Theology: New Essays in the Philosophy of Theology (2009) edited by Oliver Crisp and Michael Rea; Analytic Theology: A Bibliography (2012) by William Abraham, An Invitation to Analytic Christian Theology (2015) by Thomas H. McCall; Journal of Analytic Theology, the TheoLogica journal; the Oxford Studies in Analytic Theology, which has 19 titles . The PBS series Closer to Truth, released an episode on AT in 2018.

Disciplinary geography of analytic theology
Since the publication of Analytic Theology (2009), and with the help of several John Templeton Foundation and Templeton Religion Trust grants, analytic theology is being done in the United Kingdom, United States, Germany, and Israel. Individual scholars who would count themselves as analytic theologians, or supporters of AT, can be found at institutions in the following countries or regions: Spain, Israel, Brazil, France, Austria, and Scandinavia. 
       
Currently, there are several centers of study where analytic theology is being actively worked on in a departmental setting including the Fuller Theological Seminary, the Logos Institute at St. Andrews University, the Center for Philosophy of Religion at University of Notre Dame, Oriel College at Oxford and the University of Innsbruck.

See also
Dogmatic theology
Philosophy of religion
Philosophical theology
Systematic theology

References

Bibliography
Abraham, W. J. (2012). Analytic theology: A bibliography. Highland Loch Press. 
Wood, W. (2021). Analytic Theology and the Academic Study of Religion. United Kingdom: Oxford University Press.

External links
"What is Analytic Theology?", Closer To Truth
Analytic Theology, Fuller Studio
Analytic Theology, The Gospel Coalition
Journal of Analytic Theology

Theology
Analytic philosophy